The Weeper is the name of two comic book supervillains originally published by Fawcett Comics and today owned by DC Comics. The original Weeper was Mortimer Gloom who was an enemy of Bulletman and Bulletgirl. The second Weeper is his son who is also an enemy of Bulletman and Bulletgirl.

Weeper made his animated debut in Batman: The Brave and the Bold, voiced by Tim Conway while an unnamed Weeper debuted on the fourth season of The Flash, portrayed by Matt Afonso.

Publication history
The original Weeper first appeared in Master Comics #23 in February 1942. The arch-foe of Bulletman and Bulletgirl, the Weeper is capable of the most brutal of murders, but sheds tears for his victims; he hates to see people happy but feels bad after he hurts them. The Weeper wears a blue opera cape, a top hat, and carries a small walking stick and tear gas bombs. He also drives a hearse and is accompanied by his henchmen called the Bittermen.

Fictional character biography

Mortimer Gloom
Formerly known as the "Crying Clown" or "Weeping Willie," Mortimer Gloom is fired for dishonesty from his work as a circus performer. Sometime afterward, he commits several acts of revenge. He then takes on the name "the Weeper". The Weeper sends letters and visits a number of families telling them tragic news. He tells one family their son has died in the war. In another family, the father is fired from his job after years of dutiful service. In yet another family, he tells the husband his business has burned to the ground. Later, the families discover that the Weeper has lied to them. The Weeper tells these lies so he could either case the families' homes for robbery or they would lead him to where they hid their valuable possessions. The Weeper puts an ad in the paper looking for men who feel life has given them a raw deal. A lot of men reply to the ad. He interviews them all and picks ten of the saddest men. He calls them the Bittermen. The Weeper, along with the Bittermen, sets out to make the lives of other people very unhappy. They start by riding through a parade in a hearse and tossing tear gas into the crowd. This causes a stampede which kills a great many people. The Weeper drives through the street littered with dead bodies, weeping at that horrible tragedy. The Weeper and the Bittermen commit a series of ghastly acts which attracts the attention of Bulletman and Bulletgirl. He succeeds in capturing Bulletgirl. However, Bulletman is able to save her and the Weeper is apparently drowned.

Sometime after being defeated by Bulletman and Bulletgirl, the Weeper returns and looks to gather his Bittermen back together. One of them refuses, saying he makes enough money now to choke a horse and he is very happy. The Weeper replies saying he hates to hear that people are happy. The next day, the man is found dead after having choked on his wad of money. The Weeper then shows his other Bittermen the newspaper account of what has happened. Fearing for their lives, they join his group again. The Weeper is later betrayed by one of them where he told Bulletman and Bulletgirl what happened.

 
The Weeper is a founding member of the Revenge Syndicate. The Revenge Syndicate is started by the Murder Prophet and joined by the Weeper and the Black Rat. At first, they are at odds with each one wanting to be the chief of the group. The Weeper comes up with the idea that they roll dice to see who would be chief; the person with the highest roll would go first, the person with the second highest would go second, and the person with the third highest would go last. The Murder Prophet wins the first roll. His plan is to rob an art museum by pretending to be a visitor, with the aid of the Black Rat emerging from the sewer with a machine gun. Bulletman and Bulletgirl stop them, but they escape. The Weeper goes second. His plan is for the Murder Prophet to pretend to be a psychic at a carnival after kidnapping the real psychic. The Murder Prophet tells a rich woman to move her money so it will not be stolen. They are going to steal the money while it is being moved. Bulletman and Bulletgirl stop them after realizing their plot. They lift the car the villains are in and throw it into a lake. The Black Rat is thrown in also and saves the Murder Prophet and the Weeper. The three realize that Bulletman has always thwarted their plans and they need to eliminate him if they ever want to succeed. The Black Rat meets several criminals who agree to pay $100,000 if he gets rid of Bulletman. The Black Rat goes third. His plan is to send out a radio broadcast to lure Bulletman to an abandoned shack. They set up a dummy of the Black Rat. Bulletman and Bulletgirl go inside the shack. The Revenge Syndicate goes inside and beats up Bulletman. To their surprise, Bulletman has set up a dummy of his own. Bulletman and Bulletgirl beat them up and a fire is started when the radio is broken.

The Weeper returns a few months later on Thanksgiving Day and is captured by Bulletman, Bulletgirl, and their new ally Bulletdog. Weeper eventually died between 1942 and 1946.

Unknown

At some point between 1942 and 1946, the Weeper dies and is replaced by his son, the second Weeper. In 1946, Bulletgirl and her friend Mary Marvel fight the second Weeper and Dr. Riddle. The second Weeper says, "My father, the true Weeper, is dead -- Sob! But I am carrying on with his name!" They first try to hang Bulletgirl in her civilian identity of Susan Kent after surprising her and pulling her up with a noose and the Weeper tries to stab her also, but Mary Marvel stops them, as she was with Susan when the villains attacked. The villains escape while Mary frees Susan from the noose and she changes to Bulletgirl; however, a riddle left behind allows the two to track the villains to an abandoned asylum on the outskirts of town. The Weeper saw Bulletgirl outside, but Riddle said that was part of his plan. First the Weeper went into another room with a straitjacket while Riddle waited for Bulletgirl. Bulletgirl knocked Riddle over, not noticing the Weeper moving towards her. The Weeper placed the straitjacket on her from behind just after she decided to look for him. Then with Riddle's help, she was tied to a chair and gagged. The two villains then tell Bulletgirl they know that Mary is here also. Mary was lured in when she decided to look for Bulletgirl and stopped from speaking with a hose. While binding and gagging her, the Weeper talked about how he wept for Mary. The two villains carried the two heroines into a cell which they made airtight and left. Bulletgirl was able to remove Mary's gag with her helmet, allowing her to transform into Mary Marvel, free Bulletgirl, and break open a cell wall. The two superheroines found a riddle in the asylum and deciphered it, showing the duo were planning to rob a plane carrying gold bullion, and one of them would wait on the ground as the gold would be dropped. Mary Marvel flies after the plane after Riddle has knocked out the two pilots. Dr. Riddle is able to escape from the plane by parachute as Mary saves the plane, and knock out Bulletgirl by landing on her just as she has met Weeper II, but Mary Marvel then captures him and Bulletgirl gets the Weeper. They are then jailed.

The second Weeper teams up with Joker of Earth-Two, Doctor Light of Earth-One, and Shade of Earth-One during King Kull's plan to wipe out humanity on three Earths. Members of Earth-One's Justice League and Earth-Two's Justice Society of America travel to Earth-S and meet Shazam's Squadron of Justice—Bulletman and Bulletgirl, Mister Scarlet and Pinky the Whiz Kid, Ibis the Invincible, and the Spy Smasher. The Joker teaches the Weeper his style of committing crimes on Earth-S, stealing jewels and transforming people into different materials, with his trademark grin, although the Weeper cannot understand why the Joker laughs about crime. They are stopped by the Earth-Two Batman, the Earth-Two Robin, Mister Scarlet and Pinky, who follow a trail left by jewels on the pavement. Robin is unaffected by the Weeper's tear gas because he is wearing contact lenses and the villains are imprisoned.

In other media

Television

 The Mortimer Gloom incarnation of the Weeper appears in the Batman: The Brave and the Bold episode "Joker: The Vile and the Villainous!", voiced by Tim Conway. This version wields a cane capable of producing miniature rain clouds that make people give in to misery as well as handkerchiefs that can grow and entrap his opponents. Additionally, he is the first supervillain to use a signature motif in his crimes, previously fought Bulletman, and served as inspiration for the Joker becoming a supervillain.
 A variation of the Weeper appears in The Flash episode "Girls' Night Out", portrayed by Matt Afonso. This version was one of 12 bus passengers who became metahumans after being exposed to dark matter when the Thinker arranged for the Flash to emerge from the Speed Force. After Amunet Black discovers he can produce "love drug" tears, she captures the Weeper, only to be confronted and defeated by Killer Frost, Iris West, and Felicity Smoak, who help him escape. However, Weeper is later captured by the Thinker so he can control his wife Marlize DeVoe.

Film
The Mortimer Gloom incarnation of the Weeper appears in Scooby-Doo! & Batman: The Brave and the Bold.

References

External links
Read Master Comics #23, featuring the original Weeper
Read Master Comics #30, featuring the original Weeper
Read Bulletman #7, featuring the original Weeper with the Revenge Syndicate
Read Bulletman #10, featuring the original Weeper

DC Comics supervillains
Fawcett Comics supervillains
Golden Age supervillains
Comics characters introduced in 1942